Adam Henry may refer to:

 Adam Henry (American football) (born 1972), American football coach and player
 Adam Henry (rugby league) (born 1991), New Zealand rugby league footballer 
 Adam Henry (artist) (born 1974), American artist